Nazik Al-Hariri Welfare Center for Special Education was founded by Nazik Hariri in 1985 in Amman, Jordan.  It provides students with special needs with social care, education, rehabilitation and recreational care by helping them acquire daily life skills in addition to academic and vocational skills.

The Center provides technical consultations for institutions inside and outside Jordan.

References

Special education
Disability organisations based in Jordan
Educational organisations based in Jordan
Organizations established in 1985
1985 establishments in Jordan